Pine Lake Aerodrome, formerly Daughney Aerodrome , is a registered aerodrome located near the Alaska Highway,  west of Watson Lake, Yukon, Canada.

References

Registered aerodromes in Yukon